Natural history is the scientific study of plants or animals.

Natural History may also refer to:

Science and medicine
 Natural History (Pliny), Naturalis Historia, a 1st-century work by Pliny the Elder
 Natural History, a 16th-century work by Adam Lonicer
 Naturalis Historia Scotiae, a 1684 work by Robert Sibbald
The Natural History of Iceland, a 1752 work by Niels Horrebow
 Natural History (magazine), an American magazine
 Natural History Review, a 19th-century UK quarterly journal
 Natural History Publications (Borneo), a publishing house based in Borneo
 Natural history of disease, the uninterrupted progression of a medical condition in an individual
 Natural history group, subjects in a drug trial that receive no treatment of any kind, whose illness is left to run its course

Music
 Natural History (I Am Kloot album), 2001
 Natural History: The Very Best of Talk Talk, a 1990 album by Talk Talk
 The Natural History (band), an American rock band
 The Natural History (EP), the band's 2002 debut EP
 Natural History (J. D. Souther album), 2011
 Histoires naturelles, a song cycle by Maurice Ravel

Literature
 A 1992 novel by American writer Maureen Howard
 A 2003 novel by British writer Justina Robson
 A 2007 novel by British writer Neil Cross

Other
 "Natural History" (How I Met Your Mother), a 2010 episode of How I Met Your Mother
 NHNZ, formerly Natural History New Zealand, a New Zealand-based factual television production company

See also
 Natural theology
 Nature studies (disambiguation)
 Nature (disambiguation)
 Unnatural History (disambiguation)